The 2021 LBA Playoffs, officially known as the 2021 LBA Playoff UnipolSai, was the postseason tournament of the 2020–21 LBA season, which began on 26 September 2021. The Playoffs started on May 13, 2021 with the match Milano–Trento.

Umana Reyer Venezia were the defending champions, from the season 2018–19 as the 2019–20 season was suppressed because of the COVID-19 pandemic.

Qualified teams 
The eight first qualified teams after the end of the regular season were qualified to the playoffs.

Bracket

Quarterfinals 
All times were in Central European Summer Time (UTC+02:00)
The quarterfinals were played in a best of five format.

|}

Game 1

Game 2

Game 3

Game 4

Game 5

Semifinals 
The semifinals were played in a best of five format.

|}

Game 1

Game 2

Game 3

Finals 
The finals were played in a best of seven format.

|}

Game 1

Game 2

Game 3

Game 4

References

External links
Official website

2020–21 in Italian basketball
LBA Playoffs